The mixed relay triathlon was part of the Triathlon at the 2022 Commonwealth Games program. The competition was held on 31 July 2022 at Sutton Park, near Sutton Coldfield in Birmingham. This was to be the third time the event had been held at the Commonwealth Games. 

Australia returned as defending champions, while England, the 2014 champions, returned as hosts. 12 teams competed, the largest number ever in the event, with debuts for  Namibia, Trinidad and Tobago and Barbados, the first Caribbean nations to take part, and India, the first Asian team to take part in the event. As such, this was the first occasion when all six regions of the Commonwealth Games Federation will be represented.

Competition format
Each team consisted of four athletes (two male and two female) and each had to cover a course of  swimming,  road bicycling, and  road running. In line with World Triathlon rules for this Olympiad, for the first time the race order at the Commonwealth Games was male, female, male, female.

Result

Entry lists were published on 20 July 2022.   

England regained the title they won in the 2014 Commonwealth Games, individual gold medalist Alex Yee creating a twenty second lead over the run stage of the first leg, and Coldwell, Dickinson and  a dominant Taylor-Brown never relinquishing it. Non Stanford, building on the strong leg of Olivia Mathias, surged on the final run leg to give Wales its first Commonwealth triathlon medal, a silver 46 seconds behind the gold, with 2018 champions Australia profiting from a fast third leg from Matthew Hauser to hold on to the bronze medal a further three seconds back, but eight clear of fourth placed New Zealand.   

The number in brackets indicates individual rankings on their respective leg.

References

Triathlon at the 2022 Commonwealth Games
Triathlon 2022